Godfrey Fetherstonhaugh  (11 April 1858 – September 1928) was an Irish Unionist Party politician. He was elected at the 1906 general election as Member of Parliament (MP) for North Fermanagh, and held the seat until he resigned from the House of Commons on 16 October 1916 by taking the post of Steward of the Manor of Northstead.

References

External links 

 

1859 births
1928 deaths
Irish Unionist Party MPs
Members of the Parliament of the United Kingdom for County Fermanagh constituencies (1801–1922)
UK MPs 1906–1910
UK MPs 1910
UK MPs 1910–1918